Bellemont is an unincorporated community in Coconino County, Arizona, United States, located along Interstate 40, about  west-northwest of Flagstaff. It was a known water stop due to its local springs. As of June 2012, it had an estimated population of 893.

History
Bellemont's population was 113 in 1940, and 25 in the 1960 census.

On October 6, 2010, Bellemont was struck by three rare strong tornadoes in short succession. The 1st tornado was rated EF2, the second was rated EF3, and the third was rated EF2.  The tornadoes made 15 homes uninhabitable, resulting in the evacuation of about 30 people.  A train and 30 recreational vehicles were damaged, but no serious injuries or deaths were reported.

The Richfield Service Station, which is part of the Pine Breeze Inn, was featured in the 1969 movie Easy Rider, starring Peter Fonda and Dennis Hopper.

On May 13, 2019, actor Issac Kappy committed suicide by jumping off the Hughes Ave./Transwestern Rd. overpass for Interstate 40 in Bellemont, then being struck by a passing car on the eastbound side.

Climate
The Bellemont region experiences warm (but not hot) and dry summers, with no average monthly temperatures above .  It has an average 248.6 days per year with low temperatures below . According to the Köppen Climate Classification system, Bellemont has a continental climate (abbreviated "Dsb" on climate maps).

The Flagstaff field office of the National Weather Service is in Bellemont.

See also
 Camp Navajo

References

Bibliography
 They Came To The Mountain, by Platt Cline, Northern Arizona University with Northland Press, 1976. 
 The Santa Fe Route Railroads of Arizona Vol. 4 by David F. Myrick, Signature Press, 1998. 

Unincorporated communities in Coconino County, Arizona
Unincorporated communities in Arizona